Winston Churchill is a bus station in the community of Erin Mills in western Mississauga, Ontario, Canada. It is located northwest of the Winston Churchill Boulevard / Highway 403 interchange and is the western terminus of the Mississauga Transitway.

Metrolinx began construction of the Mississauga Transitway West between Winston Churchill Boulevard and Erin Mills Parkway in October 2013 and was completed on December 31, 2016.

Bus service

GO Transit
25 Waterloo/Mississauga
29 Guelph/Mississauga

MiWay
36 Colonial–Ridgeway
45 Winston Churchill
100 Airport Express
109 Meadowvale Express

References

External links
MiWay terminal map
Progress at Winston Churchill - Mississauga Transitway
BRT Detail Design - Winston Churchill to Erin Mills Parkway (DRAFT)

Mississauga Transitway
GO Transit bus terminals
2016 establishments in Ontario